Gao Yi may refer to:
 Gao Yi (canoeist)
 Gao Yi (volleyball)
 Koe Yeet, Malaysian actress, also known as Gāo Yì